Perth Concert Hall may refer to:

 Perth Concert Hall (Scotland)
 Perth Concert Hall (Western Australia)

Architectural disambiguation pages